Alexander Cairns (23 April 1850 – 16 June 1936) was a New Zealand cricketer. He played three first-class matches for Otago between 1867 and 1871.

Cairns was born at Newlands near Glasgow in Scotland and educated at Otago Boys' High School in Dunedin. He worked as an employee of railway companies. His brother Henry Cairns also played for Otago.

References

External links
 

1850 births
1936 deaths
New Zealand cricketers
Otago cricketers
New Zealand people of Scottish descent